Michael Joseph Fairclough (born 22 October 1952, in Drogheda) was an Irish former professional footballer who played as a midfielder for Drogheda United, Dundalk and Huddersfield Town.

Mick started his football career with Drogheda Youths and won an FAI Youth Cup medal in 1970 scoring in the replay of the final. At age 18 he played in the 1971 FAI Cup Final with Drogheda who lost to Limerick after a replay. This qualified Drogheda for the Blaxnit Cup where Drogheda lost on penalties to eventual winners Linfield.

Mick was bought by Huddersfield Town (who were then in the English Premier Division) in August 1971 and made his first team debut against Wolves in October 1971. He made 20 appearances in the 1971/72 season including games against Arsenal,   Chelsea - (see Match Programme) Crystal Palace, Everton, Spurs & Wolves. He also represented Ireland in the International match against the West German Olympic team, and scored the third goal in a 3-0 win.

Mick received a serious leg injury against Walsall on 17 September 1973 and this ultimately ended his career prematurely in 1974.

He was out of football for 6 years and then made a comeback in the League of Ireland with Dundalk F.C. after receiving treatment from Bobby McGregor the renowned Northern Ireland Physio.

His first League of Ireland game in nearly a decade came at Glenmalure Park on 2 March 1980 when he came off the bench and scored the equaliser for the Lilywhites. This goal helped secure second place in the 1979–80 League of Ireland season which meant qualification for the 1980–81 UEFA Cup. Fairclough made his European debut against F.C. Porto in the Estádio das Antas on 17 September 1980. That season he scored the winner in the semi final of the FAI Cup and scored in the Final against Sligo Rovers. - https://m.youtube.com/watch?v=oJTCoVa2b98

Mick played for Dundalk for a further 4 years where he was top scorer for 3 consecutive seasons during which time he won FAI Cup and League medals. He also scored 2 goals in the 1981–82 European Cup Winners' Cup against Fram Reykjavik. He then scored the equalising goal against the great Tottenham Hotspur team in the dramatic 1-1 draw in Oriel Park in the next round of the 1981 European Cup Winners Cup.

He won two full International caps for Ireland in 1982 after his successful comeback from injury.

In 1984, he left Oriel Park to return to Drogheda United where he started his career and finished playing there in 1986.

See History from Dundalk Museum
Dundalk F.C. History Museum

Honours
League of Ireland
 Dundalk F.C. 1981–82
FAI Cup
 Dundalk F.C. 1981
League of Ireland Cup
 Dundalk F.C. 1980–81
President's Cup: 2
 Dundalk F.C. 1980–81, 1981–82

References

Sources
The Complete Who's Who of Irish International Football, 1945–96 (1996):Stephen McGarrigle

Gods v Mortals (2010):Paul Keane

1952 births
Living people
People from Drogheda
Association footballers from County Louth
Association football midfielders
Republic of Ireland association footballers
Republic of Ireland international footballers
Republic of Ireland under-23 international footballers
Drogheda United F.C. players
League of Ireland players
English Football League players
Huddersfield Town A.F.C. players
Dundalk F.C. players
Sligo Rovers F.C. players
Newry City F.C. players
NIFL Premiership players
Transport F.C. players